Erev Rav (  "mixed multitude") was a group that included Egyptians and others who had joined the Tribes of Israel on the Exodus.  According to Jewish tradition, they were accepted by Moses as an integral part of the people. Their influence is said to have been involved in the golden calf and other incidents where the people questioned Moses and his laws.

Etymology
According to contemporary Jewish Orthodox commentary Da'at Miqra, the words roughly correspond to the "mixed many", while Targum Onkelos translates it as "many foreigners". The term appears in Exodus 12:38: "A mixed crowd also went up with them, and livestock in great numbers, both flocks and herds". The "mixed crowd" is an English rendering of Erev Rav. While Exodus 12:38 is the only mention of the complete term Erev Rav in the entire Tanakh, the term Erev by itself (which also means evening in Hebrew), also appears in Nehemiah 13:3, where it is used to refer to non-Jews. Biblical scholar Shaul Bar has suggested that the term may have referred specifically to foreign mercenaries who intermarried with the Israelite people in Egypt. Israel Knohl suggested that the word erev may be cognate to the Akkadian urbi, referring to a kind of soldier.

Jewish tradition
According to Isaac Luria, in every generation, the souls of the Erev Rav are reincarnated in numerous individuals. The Zohar, which is the foundational text for Kabbalistic thought, says the Erev Rav not only exist in every generation, but they are the cause for most of the problems affecting the Jewish people. Currently, the term Erev Rav is used by Jews in a derogatory manner to describe someone who is perceived as a traitor.

See also
 Am ha'aretz

References 

Ancient Jewish Egyptian history
Hebrew words and phrases in the Hebrew Bible